Smederevka is a white wine grape variety grown in Smederevo, Serbia and in Tikveš wine-growing region of North Macedonia. The variety's name is derived from the name of Serbian city Smederevo. Most probably the growing of this grape variety started during the reign of Roman Emperor Marcus Aurelius Probus at the site called  on the right bank of river Danube near Smederevo.

Wine
Smederevka wine has a slight acid taste, and it is usually drunk mixed with soda or carbonated water.

References

Grape varieties of Serbia
White wine grape varieties
Serbian wine